Drifting Westward is a 1939 American Western film directed by Robert F. Hill and written by Robert Emmett Tansey. The film stars Jack Randall, Frank Yaconelli, Edna Duran, Julian Rivero, Stanley Blystone and Octavio Giraud. The film was released on January 25, 1939, by Monogram Pictures.

Plot

Cast          
Jack Randall as Jack Martin
Frank Yaconelli as Lopez
Edna Duran as Wanda Careta
Julian Rivero as Don Careta
Stanley Blystone as Carga
Octavio Giraud as Manuel
Dave O'Brien as Trigger 
James Sheridan	as Piute
Carmen Bailey as Nicki
Monte Rawlins as Red 
Rosa Turich as Housekeeper

References

External links
 

1939 films
1930s English-language films
American Western (genre) films
1939 Western (genre) films
Monogram Pictures films
Films directed by Robert F. Hill
American black-and-white films
1930s American films